Steven Lee Alvord (born October 2, 1964 in Bellingham, Washington) is a former professional American football defensive tackle and defensive end in the National Football League and  World League of American Football. In his four-year pro career he played for the St. Louis/Phoenix Cardinals of the NFL and the Barcelona Dragons of the WLAF. Alvord played college football at Washington.

Professional career

St. Louis/Phoenix Cardinals
Alvord was drafted by the St. Louis Cardinals in the eighth round (201st overall) of the 1987 NFL Draft.

References

1964 births
Living people
Sportspeople from Bellingham, Washington
American football defensive tackles
American football defensive ends
Washington Huskies football players
St. Louis Cardinals (football) players
Phoenix Cardinals players
Barcelona Dragons players
Players of American football from Washington (state)